The 2016–17 Macedonian First League was the 25th season of the Macedonian First Football League, the highest football league of Macedonia. The fixtures were announced on 25 July 2016. It began on 7 August 2016 and ended on 31 May 2017 with a winter break which began on 4 December 2016 and ended on 19 February 2017. From that season the format was changed which will each team be played the other sides four times on home-away basis, for a total of 36 matches each instead of play-off and play-out after 27th round.

The league will be contested by 10 teams. Vardar are the defending champions, having won their ninth title in 2015–16.

Promotion and relegation 

1 Mladost Carev Dvor was declined their participation from the Second League due to financial problems.

Participating teams

Personnel and kits

Note: Flags indicate national team as has been defined under FIFA eligibility rules. Players may hold more than one non-FIFA nationality.

League table

Results
Each team plays home-and-away against every other team in the league twice, for a total of 36 matches each.

Matches 1–18

Matches 19–36

Positions by round
The table lists the positions of teams after each week of matches. In order to preserve chronological evolvements, any postponed matches are not included to the round at which they were originally scheduled, but added to the full round they were played immediately afterwards.

Relegation play-offs

First leg

Second leg

Shkupi won 7–2 on aggregate.

Season statistics

Top scorers

See also
2016–17 Macedonian Football Cup
2016–17 Macedonian Second Football League
2016–17 Macedonian Third Football League

References

External links
Football Federation of Macedonia 
MacedonianFootball.com 

Macedonia
1
2016-17